Kaboré is a surname. Notable people with the surname include:

Abdoul Aziz Kaboré (born 1994), Burkinabé footballer
Charles Kaboré (born 1988), Burkinabé footballer
Gaston Kaboré (born 1951), Burkinabé film director
Issa Kaboré (born 2001), Burkinabé footballer
Mohamed Kaboré (born 1980), Burkinabé football goalkeeper
Moussa Kaboré (born 1982), Burkinabé footballer
Nayabtigungu Congo Kaboré (born 1948), Burkinabé politician, leader of the Movement for Tolerance and Progress (MTP) party
Roch Marc Christian Kaboré (born 1957), former President of Burkina Faso
Zinda Kaboré, politician of Voltaic origin

See also
Kaboré Tambi National Park, national park in Burkina Faso
Kabarore
Kabaré
Kabourou

Surnames of Burkinabé origin